The New Testament narrative of the life of Jesus refers to a number of locations in the Holy Land and a Flight into Egypt. In these accounts the principal locations for the ministry of Jesus were Galilee and Judea, with activities also taking place in surrounding areas such as Perea and Samaria.

Other places of interest to scholars include locations such as Caesarea Maritima where in 1961 the Pilate Stone was discovered as the only archaeological item that mentions the Roman prefect Pontius Pilate, by whose order Jesus was crucified.

The narrative of the ministry of Jesus in the gospels is usually separated into sections that have a geographical nature: his Galilean ministry follows his baptism, and continues in Galilee and surrounding areas until the death of John the Baptist. This phase of activities in the Galilee area draws to an end approximately in Matthew 17 and Mark 9.

After the death of the Baptist, and Jesus' proclamation as Christ by Peter his ministry continues along his final journey towards Jerusalem through Perea and Judea. The journey ends with his triumphal entry into Jerusalem in Matthew 21 and Mark 11. The final part of Jesus' ministry then takes place during the his last week in Jerusalem which ends in his crucifixion.

Geography and ministry

In the New Testament accounts, the principal locations for the ministry of Jesus were Galilee and Judea, with activities also taking place in surrounding areas such as Perea and Samaria.

The gospel narrative of the ministry of Jesus is traditionally separated into sections that have a geographical nature.

 Galilean ministry Jesus' ministry begins when after his baptism, he returns to Galilee, and preaches in the synagogue of Capernaum. The first disciples of Jesus encounter him near the Sea of Galilee and his later Galilean ministry includes key episodes such as Sermon on the Mount (with the Beatitudes) which form the core of his moral teachings. Jesus' ministry in the Galilee area draws to an end with the death of John the Baptist.
 Journey to Jerusalem After the death of the Baptist, about half way through the gospels (approximately Matthew 17 and Mark 9) two key events take place that change the nature of the narrative by beginning the gradual revelation of his identity to his disciples: his proclamation as Christ by Peter and his transfiguration. After these events, a good portion of the gospel narratives deal with Jesus' final journey to Jerusalem through Perea and Judea. As Jesus travels towards Jerusalem through Perea he returns to the area where he was baptized.
 Final week in Jerusalem The final part of Jesus' ministry begins (Matthew 21 and Mark 11) with his triumphal entry into Jerusalem after the raising of Lazarus episode which takes place in Bethany. The gospels provide more details about the final portion than the other periods, devoting about one third of their text to the last week of the life of Jesus in Jerusalem which ends in his crucifixion.

 Post-Resurrection appearances The New Testament accounts of the resurrection appearances of Jesus and his ascension are placing him both in the Judea and the Galilee area.

Locations

Galilee

 Bethsaida:  includes the account of the healing of the "Blind man of Bethsaida".
 Cana:  includes Marriage at Cana as the first miracle performed by Jesus.
 Capernaum: The pericope of Jesus in the synagogue of Capernaum amounts to the beginning of the public ministry of Jesus in the New Testament narrative. Capernaum is mentioned in the gospels a number of times and other episodes such as healing the paralytic at Capernaum take place there.
 Chorazin: In  and  this village in Galilee appears in the context of the Rejection of Jesus.
 Gennesaret: This town (which no longer exists) was on the northwestern shore of the lake Galilee (also called lake Gennesaret). 1st century historian Flavius Josephus refers to the area as having very rich soil. The town was perhaps halfway between Capernaum and Magdala.
 Mount of Transfiguration: The exact location of the mountain for the Transfiguration of Jesus is debated among scholars, and locations such as Mount Tabor have been suggested.
This is the first of three instances in the canonical gospels in which Jesus raises the dead.
 Nazareth: In the gospels Nazareth is where a young Jesus grew up and where the Finding in the Temple episode took place.
 Sea of Galilee: This lake features prominently throughout the New Testament narrative, from the beginning of his ministry to the end. The encounter with the first disciples of Jesus episode takes place on the shores of this lake. Towards the end of the narrative, in the second miraculous catch of fish episode, a resurrected Jesus appears to his apostles again.

Decapolis and Perea
 Bethabara: The Gospel of John (1:28) states that John the Baptist was baptizing in "Bethany beyond the Jordan". This is not the village Bethany just east of Jerusalem, but the town Bethany, also called Bethabara in Perea. A different interpretation places Betahbara on the opposite, western bank of the Jordan, in Judea rather than Perea; best known among these is the Madaba Map, which places Betahbara at today's west side of Al-Maghtas, officially known as Qasr el-Yahud.
 Decapolis: The healing the deaf mute of Decapolis takes place in this area.

Samaria
 Ænon: The Gospel of John (3:23) refers to Enon near Salim as the place where John the Baptist performed baptisms in the River Jordan, "because there was much water there".
 Caesarea Maritima: This port city is the location of the 1961 discovery of the Pilate Stone, the only archaeological item that mentions the Roman prefect Pontius Pilate, by whose order Jesus was crucified.
 Sychar: The encounter with the Samaritan woman at the well in  takes place in Sychar in Samaria near Jacob's well.

Judea
 Bethany (near Jerusalem): The Raising of Lazarus episode, shortly before Jesus enters Jerusalem for the last time, takes place in Bethany.
 "Bethany beyond the Jordan" in  refers to another Bethany, across the Jordan in Perea, i.e. Bethabara. It is traditionally identified with the site known as Al-Maghtas on the east bank of the Jordan, while the Madaba Map places it on the west bank at modern Qasr el Yahud.
 Bethabara: see under Perea.
 Bethesda: In , the healing the paralytic at Bethesda episode takes place at the Pool of Bethesda in Jerusalem.
 Bethlehem: The Gospel of Luke (2:1-7) states that the birth of Jesus took place in Bethlehem.
 Bethphage is mentioned as the place from which Jesus sent the disciples to find a donkey for the Triumphal entry into Jerusalem.  mention it as close to Bethany. Eusebius of Caesarea (Onomasticon 58:13) located it on the Mount of Olives.
 Calvary (Golgotha): Calvary is the Latin term for Golgotha the Greek translation of the Aramaic term for the place of the skull - the location for the Crucifixion of Jesus described in the New Testament.
This is an Aramaic term that refers to the location of the trial of Jesus by Pontius Pilate and the Greek name of Lithostrōtos (λιθόστρωτος) meaning stone pavement also refers to it. It was likely a raised stone platform where Jesus faced Pilate. James Charlesworth considers this location of high archaeological significance and states that modern scholars believe this location was in the public square just outside the Praetorium in Jerusalem and was paved with large stones.
 Gethsemane: In the gospels, immediately after the Last Supper, Jesus and his disciples go to the garden at Gethsemane, the location of the Agony in the Garden and Arrest of Jesus episodes.
 Jericho: The Healing the blind near Jericho episode refers to Bartimaeus, one of the two people who are named and cured in the gospels.
 Mount of Olives: This mountain appears in a number of New Testament episodes, and the Olivet discourse is named after it. In the Triumphal entry into Jerusalem episode, Jesus descends from the Mount of Olives towards Jerusalem and the crowds lay their clothes on the ground to welcome him. In Acts 1:9-12, the Ascension of Jesus takes place near this mountain.
 Temple in Jerusalem: The Temple is featured in the Cleansing of the Temple incident, where Jesus expels the money changers.

Other places
 Egypt: The Flight to Egypt episode in the Gospel of Matthew takes place after the birth of Jesus, and the family flees to Egypt before returning to Galilee a few years later.
 "The region of Tyre and Sidon" ( and ) in what had once been Phoenicia and had become in Jesus' time part of Roman Syria, today situated in Southern Lebanon. There Jesus removed the demon from the daughter of a Syrophoenician woman.
This area is also important in the New Testament because, just before entering it in the Confession of Peter episode, Jesus asks his disciples "who do you think that I am?", producing the "You are the Christ of God" response from Apostle Peter in Matthew 16:13-20, Mark 8:27-29 and Luke 9:18-20.
 Road to Damascus: In the Acts of the Apostles (9, 22 and 26), this road is the location for the conversion of Apostle Paul. It is also mentioned in the Pauline Epistles.

Archaeology

No documents written by Jesus exist, and no specific archaeological remnants are directly attributed to him. The 21st century has witnessed an increase in scholarly interest in the integrated use of archaeology as an additional research component in arriving at a better understanding of the historical Jesus by illuminating the socio-economic and political background of his age.

James Charlesworth states that few modern scholars now want to overlook the archaeological discoveries that clarify the nature of life in Galilee and Judea during the time of Jesus. Jonathan Reed states that chief contribution of archaeology to the study of the historical Jesus is the reconstruction of his social world. An example archaeological item that Reed mentions is the 1961 discovery of the Pilate Stone, which mentions the Roman prefect Pontius Pilate, by whose order Jesus was crucified.

Reed also states that archaeological finding related to coinage can shed light on historical critical analysis. As an example, he refers to coins with the ""Divi filius" inscription. Although Roman Emperor Augustus called himself "Divi filius", and not "Dei filius" (Son of God), the line between being god and god-like was at times less than clear to the population at large, and the Roman court seems to have been aware of the necessity of keeping the ambiguity. Later, Tiberius who was emperor at the time of Jesus came to be accepted as the son of divus Augustus. And whose inscription?" and then advises them to "Render unto Caesar the things which are Caesar's, and unto God the things that are God's." Reed states that "the answer becomes much more subversive when one knows that Roman coinage proclaimed Caesar to be God".

David Gowler states that an interdisciplinary scholarly study of archeology, textual analysis and historical context can shed light on Jesus and his teachings. An example is the archeological studies at Capernaum. Despite the frequent references to Capernaum in the New Testament, little is said about it there. However, recent archeological evidence show that unlike earlier assumptions, Capernaum was poor and small, without even a forum or agora. This archaeological discovery thus resonates well with the scholarly view that Jesus advocated reciprocal sharing among the destitute in that area of Galilee. Other archeological findings support the wealth of the ruling priests in Judea at the beginning of the first century.

See also
Jesus - acts and chronology
 Baptism of Jesus
 Chronology of Jesus
 Detailed Christian timeline
 Gospel harmony
 Historical Jesus
 Jesus in Christianity
Life of Christ in art
 Life of Jesus in the New Testament
 Macmillan Bible Atlas
 Ministry of Jesus
 Timeline of the Bible
Sites associated with Jesus
 Ænon
 Al Maghtas
 Bethabara
 Qasr el Yahud
Related
 List of Hebrew place names

References

Life of Jesus in the New Testament
 
Lists of historic places